Albert Thomas Lucas (July 4, 1922 – April 26, 1995) was a professional basketball player who spent four seasons with the Sheboygan Redskins in the National Basketball League and one season in the Basketball Association of America (BAA) as a member of the Boston Celtics during the 1948–49 season. He attended Fordham University.

BAA career statistics

Regular season

External links
 

1922 births
1995 deaths
American men's basketball players
Boston Celtics players
Fordham Rams men's basketball players
Forwards (basketball)
Guards (basketball)
Sheboygan Red Skins players
Undrafted National Basketball Association players